Holsgrove is a surname. Notable people with the surname include:

John Holsgrove (born 1945), English footballer, father of Lee and Paul
Jordan Holsgrove (born 1999), Scottish footballer
Lee Holsgrove (born 1979), English footballer
Paul Holsgrove (born 1969), English footballer